Lillian Maxine Serett (1924–1994), also known as Maxine Sanini and Maxine Savant, born Lillian Maxine Harrison in Groveton, Texas, January 28, 1924, an author and lecturer on sex and sex techniques. She is best known as the author of The Housewife's Handbook on Selective Promiscuity. When she was 36 and wrote the book, her legal name was Lillian Maxine Savant, but she wrote under the pseudonym of "Rey Anthony". Advertisements for the book were deemed obscene leading to the court case Ginzburg v. United States, in which the book's publisher, Ralph Ginzburg was prosecuted and served six months in federal prison for publishing the book. Savant, the author, was never prosecuted. "Maxine Serett" was an assumed name she took on only for the trial. At the time of her death from a heart attack at age 70 in Pasadena, Texas,  she had been using the assumed name Maxine Sanini for more than two decades. An ebook of Housewife's Handbook on Selective Promiscuity, subtitled Definitive Edition, edited by Toni Savant, one of Serett's five daughters, and containing a biography of the author, was published and posted on Amazon.com on May 26, 2012.

References
Time article on the case from 1963 which gives her name as Lillian Maxine Serett, apparently unaware that her legal name was Lillian Maxine Savant.
 Despite wording on the cover illustration of the ebook version stating "The Only Book Banned by the Supreme Court," the book was never banned by the U.S. Supreme Court.  Rather U.S. Attorney General Robert Kennedy indicted the publisher for distributing obscene literature through U.S. mail in violation of federal law.  The book, in fact, was not considered obscene but U.S. mail had been used to distribute ads for the book which were found to appeal to "prurient interests." See main article 
 State of Texas Certificate of Death, Registrar File Number 03-632, date of death 30 Sep 1994.

1924 births
1994 deaths
American sex educators
American sexuality activists
20th-century American non-fiction writers
20th-century American women writers